Levente Füredy (born January 12, 1978 in Budapest) is a retired amateur Hungarian Greco-Roman wrestler, who competed in the men's welterweight category. He became a bronze medalist in the 66-kg division at the 2003 World Wrestling Championships, which earned him a ticket to represent Hungary at the 2004 Summer Olympics. Throughout his sporting career, Furedy trained under his personal coach and mentor Ferenc Kiss for Budapesti Vasutas Sport Club in Budapest.

Furedy emerged into the international scene at the 2003 World Wrestling Championships in Créteil, France, where he picked up the bronze medal in the men's welterweight category, receiving him a ticket to be selected for the Hungarian Olympic team.

At the 2004 Summer Olympics in Athens, Furedy qualified for the Hungarian squad in the men's 60 kg class by placing third and receiving a berth from the World Championships. He lost two straight matches each to Bulgaria's Nikolay Gergov (2–3) and South Korea's Kim In-Sub (1–6), who previously claimed a silver medal from Sydney four years earlier in the same weight category, finishing third in the preliminary pool, and fifteenth in the overall standings.

References

External links
 
 Profile – Origo.hu 

1978 births
Living people
Hungarian male sport wrestlers
Olympic wrestlers of Hungary
Wrestlers at the 2004 Summer Olympics
Martial artists from Budapest
World Wrestling Championships medalists